Stephen Pryor (1781 – June 1851) was an English first-class cricketer who played for Cambridge Town Club in one match in 1820, totalling 5 runs with a highest score of 4.

His son Charles and his grandson Frederick also played in first-class cricket matches for the Cambridge Town Club, as well as for other sides.

References

Bibliography
 

English cricketers
English cricketers of 1787 to 1825
Cambridge Town Club cricketers
1781 births
1851 deaths